Bye, Bye, Buddy is a 1929 American drama film directed by Frank S. Mattison and starring Agnes Ayres and Ben F. Wilson.

Cast
 Agnes Ayres as Glad O'Brien
 Robert 'Buddy' Shaw as Buddy O'Brien 
 Fred Shanley as Dandy O'Brien
 Ben F. Wilson as Maj. Horton 
 John Orlando as Johnny Cohen
 David Henderson as Marty Monihan 
 Hall Cline as Attorney

References

Bibliography
 Langman, Larry. A Guide to American Screenwriters: The Sound Era. Garland Publish, 1984.

External links
 

1929 films
1929 drama films
1920s English-language films
American drama films
Films directed by Frank S. Mattison
American black-and-white films
1920s American films